Raorchestes archeos is a species of frog endemic to the Western Ghats of India. It is known from wet evergreen forests in the Agasthyamalai and Devarmalai ranges between Kerala and Tamil Nadu.

References

archeos
Frogs of India
Endemic fauna of the Western Ghats
Amphibians described in  2014